Discrete differential geometry is the study of discrete counterparts of notions in differential geometry. Instead of smooth curves and surfaces, there are polygons, meshes, and simplicial complexes. It is used in the study of computer graphics, geometry processing and topological combinatorics.

See also
Discrete Laplace operator
Discrete exterior calculus
Discrete Morse theory
Topological combinatorics
Spectral shape analysis
Abstract differential geometry
Analysis on fractals
Discrete calculus

References
Discrete differential geometry Forum
 
 
 Alexander I. Bobenko, Yuri B. Suris (2008), "Discrete Differential Geometry", American Mathematical Society, 

Differential geometry
Simplicial sets